A "silver tongue" implies one with a tendency to be eloquent and persuasive in speaking.

Silver tongue may refer to:

Art and literature
Silvertongue, the third book in Charlie Fletcher's Stoneheart trilogy
Silvertongue, the lawyer in Hogarth's prints Marriage à-la-mode
Silvertongue, a nickname for Mortimer Folchart in Cornelia Funke's Inkheart series
Silvertongue, the surname earned by Lyra Belacqua in Philip Pullman's His Dark Materials

Music
Silver Tongue (album), a 2020 album by Torres
"Silver Tongue", a song by Humble Pie from their 1969 album Town and Country
"Silver Tongue", a song by Sonata Arctica from their 2003 album Winterheart's Guild
"Silver Tongue", a song by Deep Purple from their 2003 album Bananas
"Silvertongue", a song by Young the Giant from their 2016 album Home of the Strange
"Silver Tongue", a song by Alter Bridge from their 2022 album Pawns & Kings

Movies
Silver Tongues, a 2011 movie by Simon Arthur